Hesed Le Avraam Synagogue (or Büyükada Synagogue) is a synagogue in Büyükada, Istanbul, Turkey. It is open for services only during summer months, like the other synagogues of the Princes' Islands.

See also
History of the Jews in Turkey
List of synagogues in Turkey

References and notes

External links
Chief Rabbinate of Turkey
Shalom Newspaper - The main Jewish newspaper in Turkey

Synagogues in Istanbul
Golden Horn